Cricklade railway station was on the Midland and South Western Junction Railway in Wiltshire. The station opened on 18 December 1883 on the Swindon and Cheltenham Extension Railway line from Swindon Town to the temporary terminus at Cirencester Watermoor. The S&CER line then amalgamated with the Swindon, Marlborough and Andover Railway to form the M&SWJR, and through services to the junction at Andoversford with the Great Western Railway's Cheltenham Lansdown to Banbury line, which had opened in 1881, began in 1891.

Cricklade station was on the southern edge of the town of Cricklade, and was a passing place on the M&SWJR line, which was mostly single track. It was one of the busier stations on the line with both passengers and freight traffic, and there was a large volume of milk traffic.

As a whole, traffic on the M&SWJR fell steeply after the Second World War and the line closed to passengers in 1961, with goods facilities at Cricklade being withdrawn in July 1963. No trace of the station now remains, as link roads around the town now use the rail alignment and land beside the roads has been used for housing.

Future and Preservation 
The Heritage Swindon and Cricklade Railway aim to extend north to Cricklade in the near future, where a new "replacement" station site would be constructed as part of the S&CR's northern extension.

Route

References

 Wiltshire Railway Stations, Mike Oakley, Dovecote Press, Wimborne, 2004, 

Disused railway stations in Wiltshire
Former Midland and South Western Junction Railway stations
Railway stations in Great Britain opened in 1883
Railway stations in Great Britain closed in 1961
Cricklade